Am Féillire was an annual magazine in Scottish Gaelic that was first published in 1872 under the name Almanac Gàilig air son 1872 in Inverness by J. Noble and ran to 44 pages.

It appeared again the following year under the name Am Féillire. Further editions appeared in 1875, 1900 and then annually until 1908 and, following a long gap, finally in 1938. It varied in length, having up to 96 pages.

References

1872 establishments in Scotland
Almanacs
Annual magazines published in the United Kingdom
Defunct magazines published in Scotland
Magazines established in 1872
Magazines disestablished in 1938
Magazines published in Scotland